Georgia Lee may refer to:

 Georgia Lee (director) (born 1976), American film director
 Georgia Lee (singer) (1921 – 2010), Australian Aboriginal jazz vocalist
 "Georgia Lee", a song on the 1999 Tom Waits album Mule Variations